Helen MacLeod Thomson is a former member of the Yolo County Board of Supervisors and a former Democratic assemblywoman from California's 8th Assembly district. Thomson was first elected to the assembly in 1996 and served three two-year terms. She was the first of what have become three consecutive women from Davis to be elected to this seat, followed by Lois Wolk and Mariko Yamada.

Political career
Helen Thomson was elected in 1974 to the Davis Joint Unified School District Board of Education. She was elected to the Yolo County Board of Supervisors in 1986 and re-elected in 1990 and 1994. She won the seat in the California State Assembly in 1996, and served three terms. In 2002, when her assembly term ended, Thomson again won a seat on the Yolo County Board of Supervisors, and was re-elected without opposition in June 2006. Thomson retired from the Board of Supervisors in 2010, and was succeeded by Don Saylor.

Personal
Helen Thomson is a registered nurse, the mother of three and a grandmother of four. She lives in Davis with her husband, Captane P. Thomson, M.D., a practicing psychiatrist, and former head of the California Psychiatric Association.

References

External links
Helen Thomson - Yolo County Board of Supervisors Website
 https://web.archive.org/web/20100613045308/http://yolocounty.org/Index.aspx?page=325

American nurses
American women nurses
People from Davis, California
Women state legislators in California
Living people
County supervisors in California
School board members in California
Democratic Party members of the California State Assembly
21st-century American politicians
21st-century American women politicians
1940 births
20th-century American politicians
20th-century American women politicians